Destanee Aiava and Lisa Mays won the title after defeating Alexandra Osborne and Jessy Rompies 5–7, 6–3, [10–6] in the final.

This was the first edition of the tournament since 2013.

Seeds

Draw

Draw

References

External Links
Main Draw

NSW Open - Doubles